Pleasant Hill High School is a public high school located in Pleasant Hill, Missouri. PHHS serves students in grades 9 through 12 and is the only high school in the Pleasant Hill R-III School District.

History
Pleasant Hill High School was established in 1923. Voters passed a $90,000 bond in spring to authorize the building of a 300-student high school, which was completed that fall.

Athletics
Rooster and Chick athletic teams compete in the Missouri River Valley Conference.

Performing arts
PHHS has four competitive show choirs: the mixed-gender "Hillside Singers" and "Hillsound", the all-female "Hilltop Harmony" and the all-male "Powerhouse". Hillside Singers' 2020 season included four grand championships. The program also hosts an annual competition, the Battle of the Best.

Notable alumni
 Donna Pfautsch, legislator
 Steve Shifflett, baseball player
 Josh Smith, baseball player

References

External links

Pleasant Hill R-III School District

High schools in Cass County, Missouri
Public high schools in Missouri
1923 establishments in Missouri
Educational institutions established in 1923